Leopoldo Mastelloni (born 12 July 1945) is an Italian actor, comedian and singer.

Biography
Born in Naples, Mastelloni made his debut in his hometown, performing in theatre and cabaret. He got his first success on television with the RAI variety show Giochiamo al varietà directed by  Antonello Falqui. In films, he is best known for the role of butler John in Dario Argento's Inferno.

Filmography

References

External links
 

1945 births
Italian male film actors
Living people
Male actors from Naples